The 1904 West Virginia gubernatorial election took place on November 8, 1904, to elect the governor of West Virginia.

Results

References

1904
gubernatorial
West Virginia
November 1904 events